Importin-5 is a protein that in humans is encoded by the IPO5 gene. The protein encoded by this gene is a member of the importin beta family. Structurally, the protein adopts the shape of a right hand solenoid and is composed of 24 HEAT repeats.

Function 

Nuclear transport, a signal- and energy-dependent process, takes place through nuclear pore complexes embedded in the nuclear envelope. The import of proteins containing a nuclear localization signal (NLS) requires the NLS import receptor, a heterodimer of importin alpha and beta subunits also known as karyopherins. Importin alpha binds the NLS-containing cargo in the cytoplasm and importin beta docks the complex at the cytoplasmic side of the nuclear pore complex. In the presence of nucleoside triphosphates and the small GTP binding protein Ran, the complex moves into the nuclear pore complex and the importin subunits dissociate. Importin alpha enters the nucleoplasm with its passenger protein and importin beta remains at the pore. Interactions between importin beta and the FG repeats of nucleoporins are essential in translocation through the pore complex.

IPO5 facilitates cytoplasmic polyadenylation element-binding protein (CPEB)3 translocation by binding to RRM1 motif of CPEB3 in neurons. NMDAR signaling increases RanBP1 expression and reduces the level of cytoplasmic GTP-bound Ran. These changes enhance CPEB3–IPO5 interaction, which consequently accelerates the nuclear import of CPEB3 and promotes its nuclear function.

References

Further reading